The 2003 San Francisco Bowl was the second edition of the post-season college football bowl game between the Colorado State Rams and the Boston College Eagles at Pacific Bell Park in San Francisco on December 31, 2003. The game was the final contest of the 2003 NCAA Division I-A football season for both teams, and ended in a 35–21 victory for Boston College.

References

External links
 Game summary at ESPN
 Box score via newspapers.com

Redbox Bowl
Redbox Bowl
Boston College Eagles football bowl games
Colorado State Rams football bowl games
San Francisco Bowl
2003 in San Francisco